Oliver Valaker Edvardsen (born 19 March 1999) is a Norwegian footballer who plays for Dutch club Go Ahead Eagles.

Club career
Growing up in the club Drøbak-Frogn, he made his senior debut in 2014. After being capped for Norway U16 he joined the youth teams of Strømsgodset and Vålerenga, but as a senior player he moved to Grorud. In the first half of 2019 he scored 12 times in 19 league and cup games and was picked up by Stabæk.

On 15 July 2022, Edvardsen signed a three-year contract with Go Ahead Eagles in the Netherlands.

Career statistics

Club

References

1999 births
Sportspeople from Viken (county)
Living people
People from Frogn
Norwegian footballers
Norway youth international footballers
Association football forwards
Eliteserien players
Drøbak-Frogn IL players
Grorud IL players
Stabæk Fotball players
Go Ahead Eagles players
Norwegian expatriate footballers
Expatriate footballers in the Netherlands
Norwegian expatriate sportspeople in the Netherlands